Bedeque is a former municipality that previously held community status in the Canadian province of Prince Edward Island. It was dissolved through its amalgamation with the Community of Central Bedeque on November 17, 2014 to create the Community of Bedeque and Area.

See also 
List of communities in Prince Edward Island

References 

Communities in Prince County, Prince Edward Island
Former community municipalities in Prince Edward Island
Populated places disestablished in 2014